Savvas Constantinou (born August 28, 1971) is a former international Cypriot football goalkeeper. In November 2008 he moved to Nea Salamina replacing Panikos Orphanides. In January 2009, after some arguments with the board of directors of Nea Salamina, he was sacked and on January 15 he went to AEK Larnaca.

He started his career from Pezoporikos and then played in AEK Larnaca for eight years. Then, he moved to Digenis Morphou where he played for four seasons and finished his career.

External links
 

1971 births
Living people
Sportspeople from Nicosia
Greek Cypriot people
Cypriot footballers
Cyprus international footballers
Association football goalkeepers
Pezoporikos Larnaca players
AEK Larnaca FC players
Digenis Akritas Morphou FC players
Cypriot football managers
AEP Paphos FC managers
Nea Salamis Famagusta FC managers
AEK Larnaca FC managers
Digenis Akritas Morphou FC managers